Adrian Spillane (born 19 April 1994) is a Gaelic footballer who plays for the Templenoe club and the Kerry county team. 

He is the son of the famous Kerry footballer Tom and thus his uncles are Mick and Pat who also played for Kerry. 

His brother Killian is also a county player.

References

1994 births
Living people
Kerry inter-county Gaelic footballers
Adrian
Templenoe Gaelic footballers